WXEZ-LP is an adult contemporary-formatted broadcast radio station licensed to Hillsville, Virginia. WXEZ-LP's signal, due to its low power, only reaches about 2 miles outside the Hillsville city limits, although it does cover the entire town of Hillsville.

WXEZ-LP is owned and operated by Community Broadcasting of Hillsville.

References

External links

XEZ-LP
X
Radio stations established in 2002
2002 establishments in Virginia
Mainstream adult contemporary radio stations in the United States